The Eyrie Summer Home was the summer residence located in Seal Harbor, Maine of the Rockefeller family. It was purchased by John D. Rockefeller, Jr. in 1910. Rockefeller hired architect Duncan Candler to oversee the original cottage's expansion in 1914. The current location is home to the Abby Aldrich Rockefeller Garden.

See Also 
 Acadia National Park

References

External Links 
 

Houses in Hancock County, Maine
Rockefeller family residences